Iorwerth, O.Praem., was formerly abbot of the house of Premonstratensian canons regular at Talyllychan in Wales. He was elected to the vacant Diocese of St David's in 1215.

References

Sources
 Lloyd, J.E. 1939. A History of Wales, ii, 603

13th-century Roman Catholic bishops in Wales
Premonstratensians
12th-century births
13th-century deaths
Bishops of St Davids
13th-century Christian monks
Premonstratensian bishops
Welsh bishops
13th-century Welsh clergy